Percy P. Locey (November 28, 1894 – August 1981) was an American football player, coach, and a college athletics administrator. He served as the head football coach at the University of Denver from 1932 to 1935. He was the athletic director the latter at Oregon State College from 1937 to 1947. Locey was inducted into the Oregon Sports Hall of Fame in 1981 and into the Oregon State University Sports Hall of Fame in 1990.

Playing career
Locey enrolled at Oregon State in 1915 and played competitive football as a freshman. His career and education, however, was put on hold for a short period during World War I.   Returning to Oregon State in 1921, he became an outstanding tackle on the Oregon State Aggies football team.  Locey lettered in 1915 and again from 1921 to 1923 and was team captain in 1923.  Locey was chosen to play in the 1925 East–West Shrine Game for his on-field achievements. He also served as student body president his senior years at Oregon State (1923–24).

In 1926, Locey played football at the Olympic Club in San Francisco.  He was a member of the Olympic's "Winged-O" football eleven that handed the University of California's "Wonder Team" their first loss in five seasons.

Coaching career
In 1928, Locey took over as the head football coach at the Olympic Club in San Francisco.  In his first year with the Olympic Club, his team posted an undefeated season, with wins over future Pac-10 schools Stanford and California.  After the success of that season, Locey was promoted to head coach of all sports at the athletic club. He was named the coach of the West team in the annual East-West Shrine game in 1929, though his team was defeated that year, 19–7.

His next head coaching position was at the University of Denver, where he spent four seasons coaching in Denver and posted an overall record of 20–14–3, never having a losing season.

Athletic director
In 1937, Locey returned to Corvallis to become the athletic director at his alma mater. His most significant achievement as athletic director may have occurred shortly after the Beavers won the Pacific Coast Conference title in 1941, earning the right to play in the 1942 Rose Bowl against Duke. As Beaver fans hurried to buy tickets to the game in Pasadena, the attack on Pearl Harbor by Japan on December 7 soon put the game's future in doubt. The Army canceled the game, citing the potential of the game as a target, leaving Locey and Oregon State to scramble to find an alternative site. Locey chose Duke's home campus in Durham, North Carolina, and then oversaw the refund and reissue of game and train tickets as well as hotel reservations for the Beaver faithful. Despite being 3-to-1 underdogs, the Beavers upset Duke, 20–16, in what remains the Beavers' only Rose Bowl victory.

Locey stepped down as athletic director in 1947.

Legacy
Locey was named to the Oregon Sports Hall of Fame in 1981 and the Oregon State University Athletics Hall of Fame in 1990, both for his football prowess. He died in Corvallis in 1981. His grandson, Jay Locey, was assistant head coach for the Oregon State Beavers football team from 2006 to 2014 and is now the head football coach at Lewis & Clark College in Portland, Oregon.

Head coaching record

College

References

1894 births
1981 deaths
American football tackles
Denver Pioneers football coaches
Oregon State Beavers athletic directors
Oregon State Beavers football players
Sportspeople from Corvallis, Oregon
Players of American football from Oregon